The 2019 Men's Ford National Hockey League was the 21st and final edition of the men's field hockey tournament. The competition was held in Tauranga, New Zealand, from 14 to 22 September.

North Harbour won the title for the sixth time, defeating Auckland 2–1 in the final. Canterbury finished in third place after defeating Capital in the third place match, 2–1.

Participating Teams
For the first time in history, the NHL hosted an international team from Australia, comprising players from the country's most southern state, Tasmania. The following eight teams competed for the title:

 Auckland
 Canterbury
 Capital
 Central
 Midlands
 North Harbour
 Southern
 Tasmania

Results

Preliminary round

Pool A

Pool B

Classification round

Pool C

Pool D

Classification matches

Seventh and eighth place

Fifth and sixth place

Third and fourth place

Final

Statistics

Final standings

Goalscorers

References

External links
Official website

Hockey
New Zealand National Hockey League seasons